27th Volhynian Infantry Division was a World War II Polish Armia Krajowa unit fighting in the Volhynia region in 1944. It was created on January 15, 1944, from smaller partisan self-defence units during the Volhynia massacre and was patterned after the prewar Polish 27th Infantry Division.

History 
The unit was mobilized from secondary units from the Kowel, Łuck and Równe Home Army inspectorates as well as from former Polish policemen who had deserted German service, and numbered about 6,500 people in January 1944. After mobilization in March 1944, the division became one of the largest partisan units in Central Europe with 7300 soldiers, officers and NCOs.

The division initially aided local self-defence units during the massacres of Poles in Volhynia and fought against the Ukrainian Insurgent Army. It also fought German anti-partisan units and regular Wehrmacht troops. The unit commander, Colonel Babiński strictly prohibited any repressions against women and children. Despite this and despite the orders by the Polish government not to harm civilians, some Polish partisans retaliated against the massacre of Poles by burning down Ukrainian villages and killing ethnic Ukrainians whom they encountered on Volhynian roads.

In 1944 the division fought several major battles near Włodzimierz Wołyński (February 23), Hołoby (March 9) and Zasmyki (March 17).  During the latter two battles the division cooperated with local Soviet partisan groups and the advancing Red Army. After reaching the frontline and contacting the Soviets, Colonel Jan Kiwerski "Oliwa" was asked to combine the unit with the Red Army as a regular unit of the Soviet-backed Polish army. He declined and returned to partisan fighting. The division was surrounded by the Germans near Kowel on April 2.

After receiving a promise of Soviet help, the unit fought surrounded for two weeks. When no help arrived, the unit started to break through in the direction of Włodawa. As a result of heavy fighting, it lost between 10% and 50% of its personnel.

The division returned northwards and was surrounded by the end of May. Elements of the division broke through the Prypeć river and reached the Soviet lines. The officers were arrested by the NKVD and sent to Russia while most of the soldiers were conscripted into the army of General Zygmunt Berling.

The remnants of the division withdrew westwards, crossed the Bug River on June 7 to the Parczew Forest near Lublin. It joined other Home Army units and took part in the liberation of Kock, Lubartów, and the village Firlej on July 21.

After the Red Army reached the area they took over the captured territory. Most of the divisions officers, NCOs and ordinary soldiers were arrested by the NKVD and were interred in gulags. Only a small part joined the Red Army or the Polish Army.

Commanders 
 Colonel Kazimierz Damian Bąbiński "Luboń" - January 15 - February 11
 Lieutenant Colonel Jan Wojciech Kiwerski "Oliwa" - February 11 - April 18
 Major Jan Szatowski "Kowal" - April 18 - May 3
 Major Tadeusz Sztumberk-Rychter "Żegota" - May 3 - July 16
 Colonel Jan Kotowicz "Twardy" - July 16 - July 25

See also 
 Operation Tempest
 Przebraże Defence

References

Military units and formations established in 1944
Units and formations of the Home Army
27
Military units and formations disestablished in 1944